The Jooriland River, a perennial river that is part of the Hawkesbury-Nepean catchment, is located in the Central Tablelands and Macarthur regions of New South Wales, Australia.

Course and features
The Jooriland River rises in Bindook Highlands on the eastern slopes of the Great Dividing Range below Mount Egan west of the Yerranderie State Conservation Area, and flows in a meandering course generally east, joined by one minor tributary, before reaching its confluence with the Wollondilly River west of the Nattai Tableland upstream of Lake Burragorang. The river descends  over its  course.

In its lower reaches, the river adjoins the Nattai National Park, part of the Greater Blue Mountains Area World Heritage Site.

See also 

 List of rivers of Australia
 List of rivers of New South Wales (A–K)
 Rivers of New South Wales

References 

Rivers of New South Wales
Central Tablelands